Within chemical compound surfactants, Pentaethylene glycol monododecyl ether (C12E5) is a nonionic surfactant. It is  formed by the ethoxylation chemical reaction of dodecanol (lauryl alcohol) to give a material with 5 repeat units of ethylene glycol.

Multilamellar vesicle formation
Within the study of biological membranes and cell biology, for vesicle formation, the lamellar phase at 40wt% solution of C12E5 (Pentaethylene glycol monododecyl ether) dissolved in D2O form multilamellar vesicles under shear rate.

See also
 Octaethylene glycol monododecyl ether, C12E8

References

Non-ionic surfactants
Glycol ethers